The Ministry of Information and Communication is a governmental ministry of the Republic of Sierra Leone.

External links
 Official website

Ministerial departments of the Sierra Leone Government